Latvijas Berzs Riga is an ice hockey team in Riga, Latvia. They play in the Latvian Hockey League, and formerly played in the Pervaya Liga.

History
In the early 1960s was in the furniture manufacturing company, Latvijas Bērzs (today Latvijas Finieris), founded an ice hockey team. They participated first participated the Latvian SSR Championship in 1962. They won the Latvian Championship ten times in the 1970s and 1980s

The club played in the Vtoraya Liga from 1974-1978, but were promoted to the Pervaya Liga for two years (1979 and 1980) before they were again relegated to the Vtoraya Liga.

After the Soviet Union broke up, the club participated in the now professional Latvian Hockey League. They won the league title in 1997.

Achievements
Latvian SSR champion 1974, 1975, 1977-1980, 1983-1985
Vtoraya Liga champion 1978
Latvian champion 1997

Season-by-season record

Notable players
 Artūrs Irbe
 Miķelis Rēdlihs  
 Mārtiņš Karsums
 Oskars Bārtulis
 Ģirts Ankipāns
 Jānis Andersons 
 Guntis Galviņš
 Andris Džeriņš

References

Ice hockey teams in Riga
Ice hockey teams in Latvia
Latvian Hockey League teams
Russian Hockey League teams
Ice hockey clubs established in 1962